The 2008 American Le Mans Northeast Grand Prix was the fifth round of the 2008 American Le Mans Series season.  It took place at Lime Rock Park, Connecticut on July 12, 2008.  It was the first event to take place at Lime Rock since portions of the track were redesigned and the entire surface repaved.

Race summary
Acura scored their first overall win in the American Le Mans Series since they debuted their ARX-01 program in 2007.  The #9 Highcroft Racing Acura of Scott Sharp and David Brabham managed to accomplish the feat with Brabham making a late charge and taking the overall lead in the final 90 seconds of the race, passing the #7 Penske Racing Porsche RS Spyder of Timo Bernhard and Romain Dumas.

Race results
Class winners in bold.  Cars failing to complete 70% of winner's distance marked as Not Classified (NC).

Statistics
 Pole Position - #9 Patrón Highcroft Racing - 0:46.696
 Fastest Lap - #1 Audi Sport North America - 0:48.007
 Average Speed - 91.105 mph

References

Northeast Grand Prix
Northeast Grand Prix
Grand